Scoliacma nana is a moth of the family Erebidae first described by Francis Walker in 1854. It is found in the Australian states of New South Wales and Queensland.

References

Lithosiina
Moths described in 1854